HSwMS Spica (T121) is a former Swedish Navy Spica-class, torpedo-armed, fast attack craft (FAC), now a museum ship at the Vasa Museum in Stockholm, Sweden.

Construction and career 
The vessel was one of three constructed in the 1960s by Götaverken AB on Hisingen, the other two being HSwMS Sirius (T122) and HSwMS Capella (T123). Three similar vessels were built by Karlskronavarvet.

The vessel was taken out of service in 1989 and made into a museum ship at the Vasa Museum in her former home port of Karlskrona until 2002. It is a listed historic ship of Sweden.

Gallery

References

External links
 HNSA Ship Page: T121 Spica

Museum ships in Sweden
Ships of the Swedish Navy
1966 ships
Hisingen
Ships built in Gothenburg
Spica-class torpedo boats (Sweden)

de:Spica-Klasse
it:Classe Spica (motocannoniera)